The 1987–88 New Jersey Nets season was the Nets' 12th season in the NBA. The Nets had the third pick in the 1987 NBA draft, and selected Dennis Hopson. The team struggled finishing last place in the Eastern Conference with a 19–63 record. The team played under three coaches during the season, Dave Wohl, Bob MacKinnon and Willis Reed.

Draft picks

Roster

Regular season

Season standings

z – clinched division title
y – clinched division title
x – clinched playoff spot

Record vs. opponents

Game log

Regular season

|-style="background:#fcc;"
| 12
| December 1, 19877:30 PM EST
| Detroit
| L 115–124 (OT)
|
|
|
| Brendan Byrne Arena8,232
| 9–32
|-style="background:#fcc;"
| 15
| December 8, 19877:30 PM EST
| L.A. Lakers
| L 81–98
|
|
|
| Brendan Byrne Arena18,008
| 2–13
|-style="background:#fcc;"
| 24
| December 26, 19877:30 PM EST
| @ Detroit
| L 75–110
|
|
|
| Pontiac Silverdome23,330
| 4–20

|-style="background:#cfc;"
| 41
| January 30, 19887:30 PM EST
| Detroit
| W 116–104
|
|
|
| Brendan Byrne Arena11,894
| 9–32

|-style="background:#fcc;"
| 53
| February 26, 19887:30 PM EST
| @ Detroit
| L 109–137
|
|
|
| Pontiac Silverdome25,334
| 12–41

|-style="background:#fcc;"
| 62
| March 14, 198810:30 PM EST
| @ L.A. Lakers
| L 105–115
|
|
|
| The Forum17,505
| 16–46

|-style="background:#fcc;"
| 73
| April 5, 19887:30 PM EDT
| Detroit
| L 95–107
|
|
|
| Brendan Byrne Arena11,586
| 18–55
|-style="background:#fcc;"
| 79
| April 16, 19887:30 PM EDT
| @ Detroit
| L 96–114
|
|
|
| Pontiac Silverdome22,767
| 18–61

Player statistics

Season

Awards and records
 Buck Williams, NBA All-Defensive Second Team

Transactions

References

See also
 1987–88 NBA season

New Jersey Nets season
New Jersey Nets seasons
New Jersey Nets
New Jersey Nets
20th century in East Rutherford, New Jersey
Meadowlands Sports Complex